Badults is a British sitcom series created and starring the members of Pappy's, along with Emer Kenny, Jack Docherty and Katherine Ryan in the lead roles. Written collectively by Pappy's, the first series piloted on 23 July 2013 on BBC Three. A second and final series was commissioned by the BBC on 23 August 2013 for broadcast in summer 2014.

Plot
A series following the lives of some flatmates, Matthew, Ben, Tom and Rachel, who do their best to fulfill their age old ambition of living together as adults albeit badly and earning the label 'Badults' hence. Clark, Crosby and Parry play characters who share a flat but are "bad at being adults".

Production
The series was developed under the working title The Secret Dude Society. Andrew Collins was Script Editor.

Filming
Series 1 was filmed at BBC Scotland in Glasgow in early 2013 where it was produced by The Comedy Unit. Series 2 began shooting in early 2014.

Cast
 Matthew Crosby as Matthew
 Ben Clark as Ben
 Tom Parry as Tom
 Emer Kenny as Rachel
 Katherine Ryan as Lucy
 Jack Docherty as Mr Carabine

Reception
Bruce Dessau, comedy critic for the Evening Standard described the show as "really rather good" saying "they have simply crammed in as many gags as it is humanly possibly to cram into a half hour sitcom."

James Kettle of The Guardian said of the show, "From what I can see it's a triumph, harnessing classic comedy chops to a modern sensibility."

Iona McLaren of The Daily Telegraph regarded the series as a "failed transition" from the group's live comedy, although a reviewer from the Metro felt that any unfunny material was saved by the "sheer relentless energy" of the cast.

The second series was better received by critics than the first.

Episodes

Series overview

Series 1 (2013)

Series 2 (2014)

References

External links

2013 Scottish television series debuts
2014 Scottish television series endings
2010s British teen sitcoms
2010s Scottish television series
BBC high definition shows
BBC television sitcoms
English-language television shows
Television series by Banijay
Television shows set in Glasgow